Frances (Fran) Bodkin (born 1937) is an Australian botanist and Dharawal elder. She is the author of Encyclopaedia Botanica: The Essential Reference Guide to Native and Exotic Plants in Australia (1986). In the 1970s she helped establish the Australian Botanic Garden Mount Annan near Sydney at a former meeting site of Indigenous people.

In 2017 Bodkin received a UWS Community Award and in 2019 she was nominated for a Landcare Australia land management award.

References

1937 births
Living people
Australian botanists
Scientists from Sydney
Australian non-fiction writers
Australian women scientists
Australian women writers
Indigenous Australian scientists
Indigenous Australian academics
Indigenous Australian women academics
Australian Aboriginal elders